Mircea Vasile Oprea (born 20 April 1980) is a Romanian former football player.

External links
 
 
 

1980 births
Living people
Sportspeople from Sibiu
Association football forwards
Romanian footballers
Liga I players
Liga II players
AFC Rocar București players
CS Mioveni players
FC Politehnica Timișoara players
FC Progresul București players
CSM Ceahlăul Piatra Neamț players
FC Politehnica Iași (1945) players
CSM Unirea Alba Iulia players